On 29 April 2017, an Antonov An-26 of Aerogaviota crashed northeast of the city of San Cristobal in the Loma de la Pimienta Mountain Range in the area near Las Terrazas, Cuba, killing  all 8 people on board. The aircraft departed Baracoa Airport and at the time of the accident there were no adverse weather conditions prevailing.

Aircraft
The accident aircraft was an Antonov An-26.

Accident
The aircraft was on a military flight from Playa Baracoa Airport, Havana. It crashed into the Loma de la Pimienta mountain, near Candelaria, Artemisa Province. Initially reported as a civil flight with 39 people on board, Cuban officials later confirmed that the flight was a military flight that had crashed, killing all eight people on board.

Investigation
The Ministry of the Revolutionary Armed Forces set up a commission to investigate the accident.

References

2017 in Cuba
Accidents and incidents involving the Antonov An-26
April 2017 events in North America
Aviation accidents and incidents in 2017
Aviation accidents and incidents in Cuba